Volleyball at the 2013 Games of the Small States of Europe was held from 28 May – 1 June 2013 at d'Coque, Luxembourg.

Medal summary

Medal table

Indoor

Beach

Men

Indoor

|}

|}

Beach

|}

|}

Women

Indoor

|}

|}

Beach

Group A

|}

|}

Group B

|}

|}

Knockout stage

Bracket

Semifinals

|}

Fifth place game

|}

Third place game

|}

Final

|}

References

External links
Site of the 2013 Games of the Small States of Europe
Result book − Volleyball
Result book − Beach volleyball

2013 in volleyball
2013 Games of the Small States of Europe
2013